Monégasque may refer to:
 Monégasque dialect, the local Ligurian dialect of Monaco
 Things or people from, or related to Monaco
 Demographics of Monaco

See also 
 
Les Monégasques (disambiguation)

Language and nationality disambiguation pages